A subterranean river is a river that runs wholly or partly beneath the ground surface – one where the riverbed does not represent the surface of the Earth. It is distinct from an aquifer, which may flow like a river but is contained within a permeable layer of rock or other unconsolidated materials. A river flowing below ground level in an open gorge is not classed as subterranean.

Subterranean rivers may be entirely natural, flowing through cave systems. In karst topography, rivers may disappear through sinkholes, continuing underground. In some cases, they may emerge into daylight further downstream. The longest subterranean river in the world is the Sistema Sac Actun cave system in Mexico.

Subterranean rivers can also be the result of covering over a river or diverting its flow into culverts, usually as part of urban development. Reversing this process is known as daylighting a stream and is a visible form of river restoration.  One successful example is the Cheonggyecheon in the centre of Seoul.

Some fish (colloquially known as cavefish) and other troglobite organisms are adapted to life in subterranean rivers and lakes.

Examples of subterranean rivers also occur in mythology and literature.

Natural examples

There are many natural examples of subterranean rivers. Among them:
In Bosnia and Herzegovina: Unac; Mušnica-Trebišnjica-Krupa/Ombla (Ombla springs out of huge cave near Dubrovnik, Croatia and after just ca. 30 meters empties into Adriatic Sea's ria called Rijeka Dubrovačka); Zalomka-Buna/Bunica/Bregava; Vrljika-Trebižat; Lištica-Jasenica; Šuica-Ričina
In Bulgaria:
Banderishka reka, subterranean section below Kutelo Peak, Pirin Mountain
Struma River subterranean currents in Duhlata cave, Vitosha Mountain
Negovanka River subterranean currents in Emen cave, Veliko Tarnovo Province
Trigradska reka, subterranean section where Devil's Throat Cave and Trigrad Gorge, Rhodope Mountains
The Camuy River located in the northwestern region of Puerto Rico is one of the largest underground river systems in the world.
 The Cross Cave system in Loška Dolina, Slovenia includes 22 subterranean lakes
 The Lost River in the Appalachian Mountains of West Virginia disappears underground and reappears as the Cacapon River
 The Mojave River in southern California flows underground in most places
 The Phong Nha-Kẻ Bàng National Park in Vietnam has an underground river flowing through its cave system
 The Puerto Princesa Subterranean River on the island of Palawan, Philippines flows underground before emerging into the South China Sea
 The Punkva in Moravian Karst, Moravia, Czech Republic  underground river flowing through cave system - Punkva Caves and Macocha gorge.
 The Reka in Slovenia, which disappears in the Škocjan Caves, re-emerges as part of the Timavo in Italy.

Artificial examples

In many cities there are natural streams which have been partially or entirely built over. Such man-made examples of subterranean urban streams are too numerous to list, but notable examples include:
 The Bièvre underneath Paris, France
 The Boyanska reka (Boyana river), partially underneath Sofia, Bulgaria
 Castle Frank Brook, Garrison Creek, Russell Creek, and Taddle Creek, and other subterranean urban streams in Toronto
 The River Farset, which Belfast is named after, which runs in tunnels underneath the city.
 The Fleet and other subterranean rivers of London
 The Frome underneath Bristol
 The Hobart Rivulet in Tasmania
 Mill Creek in Philadelphia
 The Neglinnaya River, which runs through a series of tunnels underneath the central part of Moscow
 The Park River underneath Hartford
 The Spirit Lake Outlet Tunnel underneath Harry's Ridge in Skamania County, Washington, United States
 The River Team underneath the Team Valley Trading Estate, Gateshead, United Kingdom
 The Tank Stream underneath Sydney, Australia
 The Zenne underneath Brussels, following the covering of the Zenne between 1865 and 1871

Ecology
Some fish (popularly known as cavefish) and other troglobite organisms are adapted to life in subterranean rivers and lakes.

Mythology and literature
 
Greek mythology included the Styx, Phlegethon, Acheron, Cocytus, and Lethe as rivers within the Underworld. Dante Alighieri, in his Inferno, included the Acheron, Phlegethon, and Styx as rivers within his subterranean Hell. The river Alph, running "Through caverns measureless to man / Down to a sunless sea" is central to the poem Kubla Khan, by Samuel Taylor Coleridge.

The characters in Jules Verne's Journey to the Center of the Earth encounter a subterranean river:

"Hans was not mistaken," he said. "What you hear is the rushing of a torrent."
"A torrent?" I exclaimed.
"There can be no doubt; a subterranean river is flowing around us."

Several other novels also feature subterranean rivers. The subterranean rivers of London feature in the novel Drowning Man by Michael Robotham as well as in the novel Thrones, Dominations by Dorothy L. Sayers and Jill Paton Walsh in which a character remarks:

"You can bury them deep under, sir; you can bind them in tunnels, ... but in the end where a river has been, a river will always be."

See also

References 

 
Dinaric karst formations
Hydrology and urban planning
Fluvial landforms

Hydrology